Vila Madalena is an upper middle class neighborhood of the Pinheiros district in the West Zone of São Paulo, Brazil. The neighborhood is known for its bustling nightlife and its history as a center of São Paulo bohemian culture and art. The neighborhood is filled with dozens of art galleries and studios, an eclectic mix of restaurants and bars and a series of graffiti-covered streets and alleys. It is an attractive neighborhood for young professionals in the city.

References 

Arts districts
Neighbourhoods in São Paulo
Restaurant districts and streets in Brazil
Tourist attractions in São Paulo